__notoc__
The Yards is a  development on the Anacostia River waterfront in Washington, D.C. The area is at the center of the Capitol Riverfront Business Improvement District and was originally an annex of the Washington Navy Yard. The development is just west of the Washington Navy Yard and east of Nationals Park. It is served by the Navy Yard – Ballpark station on the Green Line of the Washington Metro.

The Navy Yard neighborhood was Washington's earliest industrial neighborhood, situated at the natural deepwater port along the Anacostia River. One of the earliest buildings was the Sugar House, built in Square 744 at the foot of New Jersey Avenue SE as a sugar refinery in 1797-98. In 1805, it became the Washington Brewery, which produced beer until it closed in 1836. The brewery site was just west of the Washington City Canal in what is now Parking Lot H/I in the block between Nationals Park and the historic DC Water pumping station. 

The centerpiece of the development is the Yards Park, which forms a portion of the Anacostia Riverwalk. It is a waterfront recreation area, boardwalk, and outdoor performance space at the center of The Yards development. It was built as a public-private partnership between the District government, the General Services Administration, and Forest City Washington development company. The park is operated by the Capitol Riverfront BID and has won several design and urban planning awards since it opened in 2010. Yards Park was designed by landscape architect M. Paul Friedberg.

References

External links
 

Parks in Washington, D.C.